Tipler may refer to:

People 
 Frank J. Tipler (born 1947), a mathematical physicist and cosmologist
 Frank Tipler III, a Libertarian politician in Alabama
 John Tipler, a freelance writer
 Maryanne Tipler, New Zealand mathematics textbook author

Places 
 Tipler (community), Wisconsin, an unincorporated community in Tipler, Wisconsin
 Tipler, Wisconsin, a town in Florence County, Wisconsin

Other 
 Tipler cylinder, a hypothetical object theorized to allow time travel